In programming languages with Hindley-Milner type inference and imperative features, in particular the ML programming language family, the value restriction means that declarations are only polymorphically generalized if they are syntactic values (also called non-expansive). The value restriction prevents reference cells from holding values of different types and preserves type safety.

A Counter Example to Type Safety 
In the Hindley–Milner type system, expressions can be given multiple types through parametric polymorphism. But naively giving multiple types to references breaks type safety. The following are typing rules for references and related operators in ML-like languages.

Given these, the following program unsoundly applies a function meant for integers to a Boolean value.let val c = ref (fn x => x)
in  c := (fn x => x + 1);
     !c true
endThe above program type checks using Hindley-Milner because c is given the type , which is then instantiated to be of the type  when typing the assignment c := (fn x => x + 1), and  ref when typing the dereference !c true.

The Value Restriction 
Under the value restriction, the types of let bound expressions are only generalized if the expressions are syntactic values. In his paper, Wright considers the following to be syntactic values: constants, variables, -expressions and constructors applied to values. The function and operator applications are not considered values. In particular, applications of the  operator are not generalized. It is safe to generalize type variables of syntactic values because their evaluation cannot cause any side-effects such as writing to a reference.

The above example is rejected by the type checker under the value restriction as follows.

 First c is given the type .
 When the assignment is typed, the type of c is modified in the typing context to be of type  via unification.

See also 
 Hindley–Milner type inference

References 

 Mads Tofte (1988). Operational Semantics and Polymorphic Type Inference. PhD thesis.
 M. Tofte (1990). "Type inference for polymorphic references".
 O'Toole (1990). "Type Abstraction Rules for Reference: A Comparison of Four Which Have Achieved Notoriety".
 Xavier Leroy & Pierre Weis (1991). "Polymorphic type inference and assignment". POPL '91.
 A. K. Wright (1992). "Typing references by effect inference".
 My Hoang, John C. Mitchell and Ramesh Viswanathan (1993). "Standard ML-NJ weak polymorphism and imperative constructs".
 Andrew Wright (1995). "Simple imperative polymorphism". In LISP and Symbolic Computation, p. 343–356.
 Jacques Garrigue (2004). "Relaxing the Value Restriction".

External links 
 Value Restriction — MLton
 Notes on SML97's Value Restriction — Principles of Programming Languages, Geoffrey Smith, Florida International University

Type inference